Charles Edward Moyer (1885-1962) was a pitcher in Major League Baseball. He played for the Washington Senators in 1910.

References

External links

1885 births
1962 deaths
Major League Baseball pitchers
Washington Senators (1901–1960) players
Youngstown Steelmen players
Baseball players from Ohio
People from Andover, Ohio